An inventory of the jewels of Mary I of England, known as Princess Mary in the years 1542 to 1546, was kept by her lady in waiting Mary Finch. The manuscript is now held by the British Library. It was published by Frederic Madden in 1831. Some pieces are listed twice. Two surviving drawings feature a ribbon with the inscription, "MI LADI PRINSIS".

Initial letters
Mary's mother, Catherine of Aragon died in 1536, and bequeathed Mary a gold collar or necklace which she had brought from Spain in 1501. It had a gold cross which contained, according to Eustace Chapuys, a relic of the True Cross. Thomas Cromwell ordered that the cross be sent to him. Chapuys reported that Cromwell returned it to Mary after finding its gold content was low and, as a Protestant, he had no use for the relic.

Mary owned a letter "M" with three rubies and two diamonds and a large pendant pearl. She also had an "H" with a ruby and a pendant pearl.

Goldsmiths and makers 
Mary stored her jewels in a coffer made in 1542 by the craftsman William Green. John Mabbe, a London goldsmith, mended her jewelry and made her sets of aglets. Hans Holbein the Younger designed jewels for her. Two of his surviving drawings feature a ribbon with the inscription, "MI LADI PRINSIS", (My Lady Princess). Cornelis Hayes, a Flemish jeweler, may have realised Holbein's designs. Holbeins's friend Hans of Antwerp and Rogier Horton worked for her. Another name that appears in her records is "Raynolds," which may refer to Robert Reynes, who was granted a coat of arms in 1558.

Costume set with pearls

Princess Mary had items of costume embroidered with 581 pearls in total. A lace for her neck had 67 pearls, a "nether abillment" had 33 great pearls, another "nether abillment" had 38 lesser sized pearls, an upper abillment had 40 pearls, and another upper abillment had 80 mean or lesser pearls. A partlet had 108 fair pearls, and a second partlet was sewn with 71 pearls of the same grade.

The "abillments" or "billaments" were bands of jewels worn on the coif over the forehead, typically with a French hood. On 20 July 1546, her father Henry VIII gave her an upper abillment set with 10 table diamonds, 9 rock rubies, and 38 small pearls, with another abillment of rock rubies and fair pearls, and a third abillment of diamonds, rock rubies and pearls. He gave other jewels at this time, including a cross set with diamonds and three pendant pearls and a "Jesus" or the initials "IHS" set with diamonds and three pendant pearls, a brooch with the story of Abraham set with a fair table diamond and another Abraham brooch set with 7 diamonds and a ruby, and a tablet or locket with Solomon's temple on one side a portcullis on the other. In July he gave her a brooch with the story of Pyramus and Thisbe, which had a large diamond table and four rubies, and a girdle of gold friar's knots.

Brooches and pendants
The brooches and ensigns worn in England at this time mostly depicted Old Testament subjects. A list of jewels requested by Lady Jane Grey as Queen on 14 July 1553 includes a tablet, made book fashion, with the story of David and three sapphires on the other side. There were two diamond set brooches with story of David and Goliath in the Jewel House in 1559.

According to the Venetian ambassador, Giacomo Soranzo, Mary's costume as queen involved,arraying herself elegantly and magnificently, and her garments are of two sorts; the one, a gown such as men wear, but fitting very close, with an under-petticoat which has a very long train; and this is her ordinary costume, being also that of the gentlewomen of England. The other garment is a gown and bodice, with wide hanging sleeves (con lo maniche larghe rovesciate) in the French fashion, which she wears on state occasions. She also wears much embroidery, and gowns and mantles (sopravesti) of cloth of gold and cloth of silver, of great value, and changes every day. She also makes great use of jewels, wearing them both on her chaperon (her hood) and around her neck, and as trimming for her gowns.

In addition to the inventory of jewels requested by Lady Jane Grey held by New College, Oxford and related items in the British Library and Cecil papers, the British Library has an inventory of jewels received by Mary in the first years of her reign, with some items received from Anne Seymour, Duchess of Somerset. Mary's jewels included, an "H and K" with a large emerald and a large pearl pendant, a gold whistle in the form of a mermaid, her torso enameled white and her tail of mother-of-pearl, with bracelets and "habiliments".

Mary received another whistle from the Jewel House on 3 December 1554 which was joined to a dragon set with emeralds.

Wedding at Winchester
Mary went to her coronation at Westminster Abbey in September 1553 wearing a caul or cap of tinsel fabric set with pearls and precious stones, with a newly-made gold circlet or coronet like a "hooped garland" also set with precious stones. She had to hold these heavy items on her head with her hands.

When Mary married Philip II of Spain at Winchester Cathedral on 25 July 1554, she reportedly wore a gold collar set with diamonds and pearls and the initials "P" and "M". This was inherited by Elizabeth I and was in the secret Jewel House at the Tower of London in 1605, then featuring eight pointed diamonds and a table diamond. It was worn by Anne of Denmark in 1607 at The Masque of Beauty.

At Winchester, Mary also wore a "diamond mounted on a setting in the form of a rose, with a huge pearl hanging down onto the chest". This jewel may be represented in her portraits by Hans Eworth and Anthonis Mor. Mary's pearl is perhaps confused with the Spanish royal La Peregrina pearl.

A gown of Mary's described in a later royal inventory may have been the one worn on her wedding day; a French gown of rich gold tissue, with a border of purple satin, all over embroidered with purls of damask gold and pearls, lined with purple taffeta. Elizabeth I's tailors unpicked the small pearls from this garment for re-use. The pearls from the gown seem to be those appraised for sale by the goldsmiths Hugh Kayle, John Spilman, and Leonard Bushe in October 1600, including 250 oriental pearls worth £206 and "meaner" sized pearls worth £40.

Legacy jewels

In her will, Mary mentioned as bequests to Philip II:
 the table diamond that Charles V had sent her by the Count of Egmont
 a table diamond brought by the Pedro Dávila y Zúñiga, Marquis de las Navas, presented at Guildford Castle, this was a diamond ring which Charles V had given his wife, Isabella of Portugal.
 the collar of gold with nine diamonds (presumably the collar of "P" and "M"), which Philip II had given her at Epiphany after their marriage
 a ruby set in gold ring brought by the Count of Feria.

Jane Dormer, Duchess of Feria, Mary's former lady in waiting, delivered jewels to Elizabeth I in 1559, some of which had been Mary's. The list includes a tablet with an Imperial spread eagle of diamonds on one side and two diamond pillars and the Emperor's word on the other, with a closed crown and the toison d'or, with three pendant pearls; with a "picture of Queen Marie in golde with a boxe of wood"; and a "little tablet of ten pearls which was one of the Queen's majesty's that now is (Elizabeth's), as Mistress Parry says". Blanche Parry, Lady Knollys and Margery Norris scrutinised the returned jewels for defects and losses.

Philip II subsequently received his English garter jewels.

Another item in Elizabeth's collection in 1587 was a miniature case, "a tablet with a story on the one side and a table balas ruby in the midst, and on the other side a city having in the top thereof five little diamonds and nineteen little rubies and a great square diamond underneath and within the tablet is the picture of King Philip".

Mary's abillments or billiments for wearing on her headdress seem to have still been in the Secret Jewel House at the Tower of London in 1605 when Francis Gofton made an inventory for James VI and I. Amongst her jewels in 1606, Anne of Denmark had a jewel of gold with a square emerald and a greyhound on the back, with the half rose and pomegranate, the emblems of Catherine of Aragon.

Gifts given by Mary
Princess Mary gave a number of jewels from her collection as gifts, some recorded as marginal notes in Mary Finch's inventory in her own handwriting. Mary gave Jane Seymour (died 1561), her maid of honor, a balas ruby with a little diamond and three small pendant pearls. Lady Jane Grey received a "lace for the neck of goldsmith's work".

Mary sent her brother New Year's Day gifts, and in 1546 he received a locket from Catherine Parr with miniature portraits of herself and Henry VIII.

Princess Elizabeth
Princess Elizabeth received a gold pomander with a dial or clock set in it, and on 21 September 1553, Mary gave Elizabeth the brooch of Pyramus and Thisbe and a pair of white coral prayer beads. Katherine Howard had given Mary the pomander when she was at Pontefract Castle. Mary hoped that Elizabeth would wear these jewels at her coronation, though the French ambassador Antoine de Noailles reported that Elizabeth (who supposedly preferred somber clothing) refused.

Margaret Douglas, Countess of Lennox
Gifts were given to Margaret Douglas, including a brooch made especially to be a New Year's Day gift by John Busshe, a goldsmith in the parish of St Katherine Coleman. When she married the Earl of Lennox in 1544, Mary's gifts included; a balas ruby with a table cut diamond and three mean (smaller) pendant pearls; a gold brooch with a large sapphire; a brooch of gold with a balas ruby and the History of Susanne, and a gold brooch with the History of David.

In the Bute portrait of Margaret Tudor, the mother of Margaret Douglas, currently displayed at the National Gallery of Scotland, she is depicted wearing a medallion or circular brooch at her girdle with an image and text from the story of Susannah and the Elders.

The executor of the Countess of Lennox, Thomas Fowler brought some of her jewels to Scotland, the inheritance of Arbella Stuart, possibly including gifts from Mary, and they were obtained by the Earl of Bothwell in 1590. The Countess of Shrewsbury wrote to William Cecil for help recovering Arbella's jewels. A list of 21 jewels in a casket bequeathed Arbella by Margaret Douglas, and kept by Thomas Fowler was made in April 1590. It includes an "H" of gold set with a rock ruby, and a gold sable head set with diamonds for a zibellino, but the items cannot be clearly identified as gifts from Mary Tudor. Another list of Arbella's jewels was made in 1607.

See also
 Jewels of James V of Scotland
 Jewels of Mary, Queen of Scots
 Jewels of Anne of Denmark

References

External links
 Medal of Mary, Jacopo Nizzola da Trezzo, V&A

Mary I of England
16th century in England
16th-century fashion
Early Modern England
Jewellery
Crown Jewels of the United Kingdom
Material culture of royal courts